The Palar is the Palar River, a river in the Chikkaballapura district of Karnataka state in southern India.

"Palar" or "the Palar" may also refer to:

 Palar River (Kaveri basin), a part of the same river in India, in the states of Karnataka and Tamil Nadu
 Villages
 Palar, India, a village in India in the Uttarkashi district of Uttarakhand state
 Palar Nagar, a village in India in the Kolar district of Karnataka State
 People
 Lambertus Nicodemus Palar, an Indonesian diplomat
 Events
 The Palar Challenge, an annual off-road motor race in southern India since 2006

See also
 Palar blast, a landmine attack in Karnataka, India, that killed 22 people in April 1993
 Uttarkashi–Palar Yamunotri Railway, a proposed 22 km railway starting from Uttarkashi and ending at the village of Palar, India